Constantine Vendrame, also known as "Apostle of Shillong" was a Salesian missionary from Italy who worked for the welfare of Khasis, in North East, India.

Early life and education 
Constantine Vendrame was born on 27 August 1893 to Pietro and Elena Fiori in San Martino di Colle Umberto, Treviso, Italy. He joined the Salesian novitiate at Ivrea on 15 September 1913. He completed his study of philosophy and was sent for his regency to the oratory of Chioggia. He also served for a four-year compulsory military service. After the completion of his military service, he pursued his theological formation while working simultaneously in the oratories of Chioggia and Venice.

Priesthood 
On 15 March 1924 Vendrame was ordained a catholic priest by the cardinal Eugenio Tosi at the chapel of the Archiepiscopal seminary of Milan.

Missionary to India 
Vendrame arrived in Shillong on 23 December 1924. At the start of the World War II in 1939, Vendrame and other 150 Italian missionaries were put in the concentration camp. After the war Vendrame was asked by Louis Mathias to go to Wandiwash, Tamil Nadu. He came back to Shillong in 1951. He was always busy in preaching gospel, helping needy and bringing people back to the church.

Death 
Vendrame died in Dibrugarh, Assam, India, on 30 January 1957.  On 1 July 2014 the mortal remains of Constantine Vendrame were moved to the Shrine of Sacred Heart of Jesus, Mawlai, Shillong, India.

Sainthood 
The process for canonisation is underway for Constantine Vendrame.

See also 
 List of saints of India

References 

Salesians of Don Bosco
20th-century Italian Roman Catholic priests
Venerated Catholics
Italian Roman Catholic missionaries
1893 births
1957 deaths
Roman Catholic missionaries in India